School of Computer Science may refer to:
 Carnegie Mellon School of Computer Science
 McGill University School of Computer Science
 School of Computer Science and Electronic Engineering (Essex University)
 School of Computer Science, the former name for the Department of Computer Science, University of Manchester

See also 
 Computer science education